Bilal El Khannouss (born 10 May 2004) is a professional footballer who plays as a midfielder for Belgian Pro League club Genk. Born in Belgium, he plays for the Morocco national team.

Club career 
El Khannouss is a youth exponent from Anderlecht, before moving to Genk in 2019. On 24 July 2020 he signed his first professional contract. He made his league debut on 21 May 2022 against Mechelen.

International career
Born in Belgium, El Khannous is of Moroccan descent. A former youth international for Belgium, El Khannous switched to represent the Morocco U20s.

On 10 November 2022, he was named in Morocco's 26-man squad for the 2022 FIFA World Cup in Qatar. On 17 December, he made his international debut in the World Cup third-place playoff against Croatia, which ended in a 2–1 defeat.

Honours 
Individual
Belgian Golden Shoe Best Young Player: 2022

Orders
Order of the Throne: 2022

References

External links
ACFF Profile

2004 births
Living people
Moroccan footballers
Morocco under-20 international footballers
Morocco youth international footballers
Belgian footballers
Belgium youth international footballers
Belgian Pro League players
K.R.C. Genk players
2022 FIFA World Cup players